Extreme Engagement is an 2019 Australian documentarian non-scripted reality television series on Netflix. The premise revolves around a couple, Tim Noonan and PJ Madam, going on a year-long trip to find out whether they should really get married or not after Tim proposes to her. They try to get to know each other by learning about marriage from the most remote places of the world, and visiting different cultures, learning about how marriage is regarded there, and the ceremonies and rituals that surrounds it.

The full season of Extreme Engagement consisting of 8 episodes was released on July 12, 2019.

Cast
 Tim Noonan
 PJ Madam

Release
It was released on July 12, 2019 on Netflix streaming.

Episodes

References

External links 
 
 
 

Netflix original documentary television series
English-language Netflix original programming
2019 Australian television series debuts